Klaus Ehrle (born 11 March 1966) is an Austrian hurdler. He competed in the men's 400 metres hurdles at the 1988 Summer Olympics.

References

1966 births
Living people
Athletes (track and field) at the 1988 Summer Olympics
Austrian male hurdlers
Olympic athletes of Austria
Place of birth missing (living people)